The 60th Filmfare Awards were held to honor the best films of 2014 from the Hindi-language film industry on 31 January 2015 at the Yash Raj Studio in Mumbai. The ceremony was hosted by Karan Johar, Alia Bhatt and Kapil Sharma.

Queen led the ceremony with 13 nominations, followed by Haider and Highway with 9 nominations each.

Queen won 6 awards, including Best Film, Best Director (for Vikas Bahl) and Best Actress (for Kangana Ranaut), thus becoming the most-awarded film at the ceremony.

Haider was the runner-up of the ceremony with 5 awards, including Best Actor (for Shahid Kapoor), Best Supporting Actor (for Kay Kay Menon) and Best Supporting Actress (for Tabu).

Winners and nominees
The nominations were announced on January 19, 2015.

Awards

Critics' awards

Technical Awards

Special awards

Multiple Nominations
Queen – 13
 Haider, Highway – 9
 2 States, Mardaani, PK – 8
 Ankhon Dekhi, Dedh Ishqiya, Finding Fanny, Ugly – 5
 Bang Bang!, Ek Villain, Hasee Toh Phasee, Heropanti, Khoobsurat, Kick, Mary Kom – 3
 Gunday, Happy New Year, Miss Lovely, Youngistaan – 2

Multiple Awards
Queen – 6
 Haider – 5
 Ankhon Dekhi – 3
 PK – 2

External links 
 60th Filmfare Awards on IMDb

References

2015 Indian film awards
Filmfare Awards